José Pittaro (born 23 July 1946) is a former Argentine cyclist. He competed in the sprint and the 1000m time trial at the 1968 Summer Olympics.

References

External links
 

1946 births
Living people
Argentine male cyclists
Olympic cyclists of Argentina
Cyclists at the 1968 Summer Olympics
Sportspeople from San Miguel de Tucumán
Pan American Games medalists in cycling
Pan American Games silver medalists for Argentina
Medalists at the 1971 Pan American Games